Max Charroin (22 December 1924 – 30 March 2007) was a French racing cyclist. He rode in the 1950 Tour de France.

References

1924 births
2007 deaths
French male cyclists
Place of birth missing